Callisto Cliffs, rising to , are two cliffs, one forming the southern margins of Jupiter Glacier, the other the eastern margin of Alexander Island, Antarctica. The feature was mapped from trimetrogon air photography taken by the Ronne Antarctic Research Expedition, 1947–48, and from survey by the Falklands Islands Dependencies Survey, 1948–50, and was named by the UK Antarctic Place-names Committee in association with Jupiter Glacier after Callisto, one of the moons of the planet Jupiter.

See also

 Burn Cliffs
 Cannonball Cliffs
 Corner Cliffs

References
 

Cliffs of Alexander Island